Elkhart is a city in Elkhart County, Indiana, United States. Elkhart has the larger population of the two principal cities of the Elkhart-Goshen Metropolitan Statistical Area, which in turn is part of the South Bend-Elkhart-Mishawaka Combined Statistical Area, in a region commonly known as Michiana. The population was 53,923 at the 2020 census.

History

When the Northwest Territory was organized in 1787, the area now known as Elkhart was mainly inhabited by the Ottawa, Chippewa, and Potawatomi Indian tribes. In 1829, the Village of Pulaski was established, consisting of a post office, mill, and a few houses on the north side of the St. Joseph River. Dr. Havilah Beardsley moved westward from Ohio, and on August 9, 1821, purchased one square mile of land from Pierre Moran (a half-French, half-Native American Potawatomi Chief) in order to establish a rival town named Elkhart. The town of Elkhart was first plotted with 48 lots on April 30, 1832. In 1839, the Pulaski Post Office was officially changed to Elkhart.

Elkhart County was founded exclusively by immigrants from New England.  These were old-stock "Yankee" immigrants, that is to say, they were descended from the English Puritans who settled New England in the 1600s.  The completion of the Erie Canal caused a surge in New England immigration to what was then the Northwest Territory.  The end of the Black Hawk War led to an additional surge of immigration, once again coming almost exclusively from the six New England states as a result of overpopulation combined with land shortages in that region.  Some of these later settlers were from upstate New York and had parents who had moved to that region from New England shortly after the Revolutionary War. New Englanders and New England transplants from upstate New York were the vast majority of Elkhart County's inhabitants during the first several decades of its history.  These settlers were primarily members of the Congregational Church though due to the Second Great Awakening many of them had converted to Methodism and some had become Baptists before coming to what is now Elkhart County.  The Congregational Church subsequently has gone through many divisions, and some factions, including those in Elkhart County, are now known as the Church of Christ and the United Church of Christ.  As a result of this heritage the vast majority of inhabitants in Elkhart County, much like antebellum New England were overwhelmingly in favor of the abolitionist movement during the decades leading up to the Civil War.  Correspondingly, many inhabitants of Elkhart County fought in the Union Army during the Civil War.  In the late 1880s and early 1890s Irish and German migrants began moving into Elkhart County, most of these later immigrants did not move directly from Ireland and Germany, but rather from other areas in the Midwest where they had already been living, particularly the state of Ohio.

By the late 19th and early 20th century, musical instrument factories, Miles Medical Company, and numerous mills set up shop and became the base of the economy. In 1934, the first recreational vehicle factory opened in Elkhart. Similar companies followed suit for the remainder of the decade, and the economy continued to grow until the rationing of materials in World War II. After the war, growth picked back up, and, by 1949, Elkhart was officially dubbed the "RV Capital of the World."

Infrastructure
In 1851, the Michigan Southern & Northern Indiana Railroad Company built the first rail line through the city, and by 1852 the first passenger train passed through town. This, in turn, caused major population growth. Today, Norfolk Southern has the biggest railroad presence in town, although Elkhart has two other railroads: Shortline-Elkhart and Western (operated by Pioneer Railcorp) and Regional-Grand Elk (operated by Watco). Amtrak has two trains that stop in Elkhart, Lake Shore Limited and Capitol Limited, both of which stop at the Elkhart station. Canadian Pacific runs 6-8 trains through town on Norfolk Southern's trackage.

In 1867, Elkhart Hydraulic Company built the first hydroelectric dam across the St. Joseph River and by 1870, it powered the city. Today, the dam still produces electric power and is operated by Indiana Michigan Power, a subsidiary of American Electric Power.

In 1889, the world's second electric streetcar system began operating on the city's streets.  It has since been decommissioned.

The Beardsley Avenue Historic District, Albert R. Beardsley House, Dr. Havilah Beardsley House, Emmanuel C. Bickel House, Bridge Street Bridge, Charles Gerard Conn Mansion, Elkhart Downtown Commercial Historic District, Green Block, William and Helen Koerting House, Lerner Theatre, Mark L. and Harriet E. Monteith House, Morehous Residential Historic District, State Street-Division Street Historic District, and Young Women's Christian Association are listed on the National Register of Historic Places.

Name
Although apparently a name of German or Germanic origin, the etymology of the city's name is disputed. One source argues that the city's Island Park looks like an elk's heart.  Another source claims that the origin of the city's name was the Shawnee Indian Chief Elkhart ( 'Elk-heart'), cousin of the famous Chief Tecumseh, and the father of Mishawaka ( 'Elk-woman'), the namesake of neighboring Mishawaka. Other sources state that the name stems from the Miami-Illinois village name  ('Elk Hart').

Geography
Elkhart is located at  (41.683149, -85.968798).

The city sits on the St. Joseph and Elkhart Rivers. The Elkhart River drains into the St. Joseph at Island Park just north of downtown. There are also numerous small lakes around the city.

Climate
Elkhart has a humid continental climate (Köppen Dfa), with cold, snowy winters and warm, humid summers.

Demographics

2020 census

Note: the US Census treats Hispanic/Latino as an ethnic category. This table excludes Latinos from the racial categories and assigns them to a separate category. Hispanics/Latinos can be of any race.

2010 census
As of the census of 2010, there were 50,949 people, 19,261 households, and 11,942 families residing in the city. The racial makeup of the city was 66.1% White, 15.4% African American, 0.6% Native American, 0.9% Asian, 0.1% Pacific Islander, 12.9% from other races, and 4.1% from two or more races. Hispanic or Latino of any race were 22.5% of the population.

There were 19,261 households, of which 36.9% had children under the age of 18 living with them, 36.7% were married couples living together, 18.5% had a female householder with no husband present, 6.7% had a male householder with no wife present, and 38.0% were non-families. 30.8% of all households were made up of individuals, and 10.5% had someone living alone who was 65 years of age or older. The average household size was 2.60, and the average family size was 3.25.

The median age in the city was 32.7 years. 29.1% of residents were under 18; 9.4% were between the ages of 18 and 24; 27.5% were from 25 to 44; 22.5% were from 45 to 64, and 11.5% were 65 years of age or older. The gender makeup of the city was 48.2% male and 51.8% female.

2000 census
As of the 2000 census, 51,874 people, 20,072 households, and 12,506 families reside in the city. The racial makeup of the city was 71.5% White (predominantly German American), 14.7% African American, 0.4% Native American, 1.2% Asian, 0.1% Pacific Islander, 9.2% from other races, and 2.9% from two or more races. Hispanic or Latino of any race were 14.8% of the population.

Of the 20,072 households, 62.3% were occupied by families, 33.4% had children under 18 living with them, 40.9% were married couples living together, 15.3% had a female householder with no husband present, and 37.7% were non-families. 30.3% of all households were made up of individuals, and 10.3% had someone living alone who was 65 years of age or older. The average household size was 2.55, and the average family size was 3.16.

Of the city's population, 28.4% was under 18, 11.1% from 18 to 24, 31.7% from 25 to 44, 18.0% from 45 to 64, and 10.7% was 65 years of age or older. The median age was 31 years. For every 100 females, there were 96.9 males. For every 100 females aged 18 and over, there were 94.6 males.

The median income for a household in the city was $34,863, and the median income for a family was $40,514. Males had a median income of $30,674 versus $22,760 for females. The per capita income for the city was $17,890. About 11.1% of families and 13.6% of the population were below the poverty line, including 18.6% of those under age 18 and 9.0% of those age 65 or over.

Economy

Due to its proximity to the South Bend metropolitan area, the city's commercial sectors are small. The city's main shopping mall is the Concord Mall, located on the city's south side. A second shopping mall, Pierre Moran Mall, was torn down in 2006 for a new development called Woodland Crossing. Many residents prefer to shop and dine in neighboring Mishawaka due to that city's larger selection of stores and restaurants.

Industry
Elkhart is best known for two industries: recreational vehicles and musical instruments. For decades, it has been referenced as the "RV Capital of the World" and the "Band Instrument Capital of the World". Other notable industries in Elkhart include; pharmaceuticals, electronic components, manufactured housing and mobile homes.  Numerous manufacturers of musical instruments and accessories, of which most of the surviving companies have been absorbed into the Conn-Selmer conglomerate, have a long history in the city. Elkhart is also home to the Robert Young Rail Yards, which are the second-largest freight classification yards in the world.

In 1884, Dr. Franklin Miles launched the Miles Medical Co. in Elkhart, which in later decades produced products such as Alka-Seltzer and Flintstones Vitamins. In 1979, the Miles Medical Co. was purchased by the German company Bayer, and was consolidated into the larger Pittsburgh-based Bayer, Inc. by 1995. In 1999, Bayer Consumer Care moved out of Elkhart. By 2006, Bayer had pulled all manufacturing out of Elkhart. Most of the facilities were torn down while just a few buildings remained, mostly unused.

Elkhart is home to many Recreational vehicle (RV) manufacturers, boat manufacturers, and van conversion companies, including Bennington Marine, Forest River Inc Hy-Line, Keystone, Skyline, Sun Valley, Travel Supreme, THOR Motor Coach, and many other manufacturers, including Gulf Stream, and Jayco, can be found nearby in Goshen, Middlebury, Nappanee and Wakarusa.

NIBCO INC. (Northern Indiana Brass Company), has called Elkhart home for over 100 years and is now a fifth-generation family business. NIBCO Inc. manufactures and markets flow control products.

Elkhart Brass Manufacturing has been a cornerstone of Elkhart's industrial base. From its location in the heart of Elkhart's industrial area at West Beardsley Avenue, Elkhart Brass Manufacturing has become a leader in the creation of innovative fire-fighting equipment.

The unemployment rate reached 18.8% in April 2009 and due to Elkhart's economic troubles, the city and some of its unemployed residents were featured on the February 8, 2009, edition of ABC News. The unemployment rate rebounded over the next decade and has remained below the national average since 2013.

Arts and culture

Theater

In 1884, the Bucklen Opera House opened its doors for the first time, with a seating capacity of 1200. It was common for one performance to take place every week. Elkhart's location on the railroad made it a good stopping point for shows traveling from New York to Chicago. In 1896, the first movie was shown in the theater, which was also used as Elkhart High School's auditorium until 1924. The Bucklen was demolished in 1986.

The Lerner Theatre, formerly the ELCO Performing Arts Center, is a small theater located downtown. After being built in 1924 and undergoing two name changes, it became the ELCO in 1934. Ownership switched hands several times, but the end of the Lerner appeared to be in sight when owner William Miller died in 1987. In 1990, the city bought the theater to prevent further deterioration due to vacancy.  Also, that year, some locals formed a commission to oversee the restoration. Funding issues led the city to get involved further in the form of getting a federal grant. The grant helped with major upgrades and the hiring of full-time staff.

The ELCO was renamed The Lerner when it reopened after an $18 million renovation and expansion in June 2011. It is now used for a wide range of concerts, special events, and local productions.

Museums
There are many different museums located in the city.

 Woodlawn Nature Center is a small natural history museum and activity center that includes 10 acres of woods. It features exhibits and programs for all ages designed to connect as many people as possible to nature, natural history, and the planet's future.
 The Midwest Museum of American Art has over 6,000 works in its collection and offers 8-10 temporary showings per year.
 The National New York Central Railroad Museum tells the history of the New York Central, Penn Central, Amtrak and Conrail railroads. Conrail established the Rail Yards in Elkhart which is now owned by Norfolk Southern.
 The RV/MH Hall of Fame & Museum was once located in the city but has now been moved to a new facility along the toll road. Elkhart County is known as the RV Capital of the World.
 The Ruthmere Museum was the mansion once occupied by Albert R. and Elizabeth Baldwin Beardsley, the descendants of the city's founder. This museum features a world-class fine arts collection and a historical recreation of the home as it was in the 1910s and 20s. 
 The Havilah Beardsley House is also part of the Ruthmere Museum Campus. Built in 1848, this home once belonged to the founder of Elkhart, Havilah Beardsley. Today, it has been restored to the style of the 1870s, at which time Havilah's son, James Rufus Beardsley, gutted and remodeled the entire home into its current Italianate style.
 The "Time Was" Museum is a small, historical museum that depicts what life was like in the early twentieth century.
 The Hall of Heroes Superhero Museum is a small private museum preserving and displaying the 80+ year history of superheroes in comic books, film, television, and other media.

Events
The Elkhart Jazz Festival is a three-day event that takes place in late June on the banks of the Elkhart River. It is known as one of the premier Jazz festivals in the nation. In 2007, the festival celebrated its 20th anniversary.

Each June, the Elkhart Parks and Recreation Department presents Rhapsody Arts & Music Festival (formally called Rhapsody in Green). It is a weekend event put on at the city's Island Park. It is a typical summer festival with live music and food.

Also, the Elkhart Air Show was an annual event that took place at the Elkhart Municipal Airport at the end of July. It featured a wide variety of airplanes old and new. The event was canceled in 2007 due to financial issues. It is unclear whether the show is on hiatus or gone for good.

Public library
The city is served by the Elkhart Public Library, which operates four branches.

Sports
The Elkhart Miracle was a proposed independent minor league baseball team that was scheduled to begin to play in the Northern League in 2015. The stadium was to be located on the city's southwest side on State Road 19. As of December 2017, the stadium had not yet been built, and the team was not formed, due to construction delays.

The Elkhart Express was a semi-professional men's basketball team in the International Basketball League. Their home games were played at North Side Gymnasium, located inside Elkhart's North Side Middle School. The franchise began operation in 2006 and won the International Title in 2006 and 2007.  The Elkhart Express officially released news that they were folding under bankruptcy on January 5, 2009.  In January 2010, head coach and founder Daimon Beathea announced that the Express would return for the 2010 season, but those plans never came to fruition.

Parks and recreation

The city has 35 different facilities including parks, pavilions, a waterpark, a public pool, a softball complex, two skateparks, greenways, and the downtown riverwalk, which now features an ice-skating/roller-blading path (depending on the time of year).

The NIBCO Water and Ice Park in downtown Elkhart was dedicated in 2007. It is a year-round park with an ice skating path in the winter and a splash pad in the summer.  A spray park was built at McNaughton Park in 2007.

Rainbow Park is notable because it is both a park and a residential front yard. It is a popular recreation destination for the house owners and their houseguests.

Wellfield Botanic Gardens on North Main Street is a 36-acre "living museum" offering over 20 individually themed gardens and public events throughout the year.

Government
The mayor of Elkhart is Rod Roberson, a Democrat, and the first African American to be elected mayor. The government consists of a mayor and a city council. The mayor is elected in a citywide vote. The city council consists of nine members—six are elected from individual districts, while three are elected at large.

Education

Public schools
Three school districts serve sections of Elkhart:
The Baugo Community Schools serve the southwest side of the city and the west central part of the county.  That system is made up of one elementary school (Jimtown Elementary), an intermediate, a junior high, and a high school each named Jimtown.
The Concord Community Schools serve the southeast side of the city of Elkhart and northwest Goshen.  This system consists of four elementary schools (East Side, Ox Bow, South Side, and West Side), an intermediate school, a junior high school, and a high school, all named Concord.
The Elkhart Community Schools, the largest district, serve most of the city and the populated northwest side of the county.  The system includes fourteen elementary schools (Beardsley, Bristol, Cleveland, Eastwood, Hawthorne, Mary Beck, Mary Daly, Mary Feeser, Monger, Oslo, Pinewood, Riverview, Roosevelt, and Woodland), three middle schools (North Side, Pierre Moran, and West Side), one high school, split between two buildings (Elkhart High School and The Freshman Division), one alternative school (L.I.F.E / Tipton Street Center), and the Elkhart Area Career Center.

Private schools
In addition to the public schools, four private religious schools serve the city.  Elkhart Christian Academy (grades K-12), Trinity Lutheran School (K-8), St. Vincent de Paul Catholic School (grades K-8), and St. Thomas the Apostle School (grades K-8) are located in Elkhart.  Additionally, Two private secular schools exist:  The Montessori School of Elkhart on Montessori Drive runs from pre-K through Grade 6. Cornerstone Christian Montessori School (K-6)

Higher education
Anabaptist Mennonite Biblical Seminary has been at its south-side location since 1958.
Bethel College of neighboring Mishawaka has a small location on the city's south side.
Beulah Bible College & Seminary has been at its southwest location since 1995. It is the first H.B.C. in Elkhart. 
Indiana Institute of Technology has a small operation on Middlebury Street on the city's east side.
Indiana University South Bend, which is the third largest of the Indiana University campuses, operates an Elkhart Center located in the city's downtown area. The center moved to its downtown location in August 2007.
Ivy Tech Community College is a statewide system of community colleges, as well as the second largest institution of higher education in the state of Indiana, and has a campus directly off County Road 17, which is a fast-growing commercial and industrial corridor.

Media
The Elkhart Truth is the main newspaper that serves the city of Elkhart and the county.

Elkhart lies in the South Bend-Elkhart television market, the 89th largest in the United States as of 2008. One television station, WSJV-TV (Heroes & Icons Network) is located in the city, along with a number of radio stations including WTRC, WAOR, WCMR, WFRN-FM, and WVPE (NPR). Elkhart is also served by CBS affiliate WSBT-TV, based in Mishawaka, and six stations in South Bend: WNDU-TV (NBC), WNIT-TV (PBS), WHME-TV (LeSEA), WBND-LD (ABC), WCWW-LD (CW) and WMYS-LD (My Network TV).

Infrastructure

Transportation

Major roads
Elkhart is located on the Indiana Toll Road (Interstates 80/90) at exits 92 and 96 and on the eastern portion of the St. Joseph Valley Parkway (U.S. Route 20) which bypasses the southern side of the city.  State Road 19 runs through the city while U.S. Route 33 and State Road 120 terminate in the city.  U.S. 33 used to run through the city, and that route was part of the original Lincoln Highway.

Rail
Amtrak, the national passenger rail system, serves the Elkhart Train Station. Two routes, the Capitol Limited and Lake Shore Limited stop at the station, along the former New York Central Railroad line. The Capitol Limited connects Chicago to Washington, DC and the Lake Shore Limited connects Chicago to New York City and Boston. Both lines connect to their eastern destinations via Cleveland with one train offered for each direction on each route daily.

Airports
Elkhart Municipal Airport (EKM) is located on the city's northwest side. No commercial flights are offered, but two charter flight services operate out of the airport. South Bend International Airport (SBN) is the closest airport with commercial airline service.

The Mishawaka Pilots Club Airport (3C1) is just outside the southwest edge of the city of Elkhart. Mishawaka Pilots Club Airport is a privately owned, public-use facility.

Interurban Trolley

Elkhart is a central hub for the Interurban Trolley regional public bus service, which stops at various destinations throughout the city and connects it to neighboring Goshen, Osceola, Dunlap and Mishawaka. It was originally known as the BUS system. The system's name is derived from its use of vintage-trolley-style buses that run between several different cities and towns, evoking the interurban train networks that were common in the United States during the first half of the 20th century. The Interurban Trolley operates each day, except Sundays or major holidays.

Connections to other transit systems
Bittersweet/Mishawaka Route links up with TRANSPO's Route 9 in Mishawaka, which in turn connects riders to downtown South Bend and the South Shore Station, TRANSPO's transit hub. North Pointe Route stops at Elkhart's Greyhound station. Elkhart-Goshen and Concord route both stop near the Elkhart Train Station.

Notable people

 Philip Allen, politician
 Thomas Atkins, first African-American student body president at Indiana University and NAACP leader
 Erich Barnes, football player
 Harold S. Bender, theologian
 Lindsay Benko, gold medalist Olympic swimmer
 Charles G. Conn, founder of Conn Musical Instruments
 Lou Criger, first Opening Day catcher in Boston Red Sox history
 David Darling, classical cellist
 Nancy DeShone, All-American Girls Professional Baseball League player
Andrea Drews, United States women's national volleyball team, (MVP of the 2019 FIVB Volleyball Women's Nations League and Best Opposite of the 2019 FIVB Women's World Cup)
 Ernestine Evans, prominent journalist, editor, and literary agent
 Tracy Ferrie, musician
 Ric Flauding, classical composer
 Farrah Forke, actress
 Bill Frink, sportscaster
 John F. Funk, publisher and Mennonite leader
 Charles Gordone, Pulitzer Prize dramatist
 David Gundlach, an insurance company founder and film producer who bequeathed $125 million to the Elkhart County Community Foundation
 Jean Hagen, actress, lead role in Singin' in the Rain
 Thomas Hampson, baritone
 Amber Jacobs, WNBA basketball player
 Ernie Jones, NFL player (wide receiver)
 Shawn Kemp, former NBA basketball player
 Paul W. Klipsch, founder, Klipsch Audio Technologies
 Alan Kreider, church historian
 Robert Lim (1897 – 1969) Chinese doctor and Lieutenant General in the Republic of China Army
 Deirdre Lovejoy, actress
 Ted Luckenbill, NBA basketball player
 Clarence C. Moore, engineer, supporter of HCJB and founder of Crown International
 Philip Myers, principal horn player with the New York Philharmonic
 Carrie Newcomer, musician, singer, songwriter
 Peter Reckell, actor
 Joe Schoen, NFL general manager
 Connie Smith, country musician, singer, songwriter
 Robert Spano, music director of the Atlanta Symphony Orchestra and the Brooklyn Philharmonic
 Shafer Suggs, Ball State and NFL player
 George Terlep, professional football player, coach, and general manager
 Enock Hill Turnock, architect
 Georgy Vins, pastor, human right activist, Soviet dissident
 Rich Wingo, linebacker for the Green Bay Packers
 John Howard Yoder, theologian and ethicist

Twin towns - sister cities
Elkhart has four sister cities as designated by Sister Cities International.

 Burton upon Trent, England, United Kingdom
 Kardzhali, Bulgaria
 Tongxiang, China
 Apan, México

References

External links

 
 Chamber of Commerce
 
 

 
Cities in Indiana
Cities in Elkhart County, Indiana
Majority-minority cities and towns in Indiana
1832 establishments in Indiana
Populated places established in 1832